The following highways are numbered 748:

Costa Rica
 National Route 748

India
 National Highway 748 (India)

United States